In financial markets, market if touched or MIT is a type of order that will be executed when the price is touched (when a predetermined value has been reached and the futures contract will trade or bid at the price).

Stock buyers can place an MIT order to buy or to sell.

References

External links
Roboforex Review

Financial markets
Share trading